Merry Christmas, Baby, is the first Christmas album by Rod Stewart and his 27th studio album overall, released on 30 October 2012. The album has proved to be a top 10 success in many countries including the UK, US, Canada and Australia. It was certified Platinum by the Recording Industry Association of America in November 2012 with over 1,000,000 copies sold in the US.

Critical reception

Merry Christmas, Baby received mixed reviews from music critics. At Metacritic, which assigns a normalized rating out of 100 to reviews from mainstream critics, the album received an average score of 53, which indicates "mixed or average reviews", based on 6 reviews.

Commercial performance
Merry Christmas, Baby debuted at No. 3 on the Billboard 200 album sales chart, with first week sales of 117,000 copies according to Nielsen SoundScan, and spent a total of eight weeks in the top 10. With total U.S. sales of 858,000 copies in 2012 according to SoundScan, Merry Christmas, Baby was the best-selling Christmas/holiday album of the year. The album was also the year's fifteenth best-selling album in the U.S. according to Billboard and the ninth best-selling physical album in the U.S. according to the Nielsen Company's 2012 Music Industry Report.

In the UK, the album debuted at No. 2 on the Official Albums Chart and has so far spent six weeks in the top 10. It sold 421,000 copies in the UK in 2012 and its current UK sales stand at 636,000.

In Canada, the album spent eight weeks in the top ten of the Canadian Albums Chart, with three consecutive weeks at the No. 1 spot. It was the ninth best-selling album in Canada in 2012 according to year-end sales data from Nielsen SoundScan Canada with sales of 135,000.

Worldwide, the album achieved total 2012 sales of 2.6 million according to the International Federation of the Phonographic Industry, making it the seventh best-selling album of the year.

Track listing
All tracks produced by David Foster; except "Auld Lang Syne" produced by Rod Stewart and Kevin Savigar.

Note
 "What Are You Doing New Year's Eve" uses a vocal sample of the Ella Fitzgerald recording of the same name

Personnel 
Main
 Rod Stewart – lead vocals, musical arrangements (11-13)
 Jochem van der Saag – synthesizer programming (1-12)
 David Foster – acoustic piano (1-3, 6-8, 10), keyboards (5, 9, 11-12), string arrangements (1, 3-4, 9–13), horn arrangements (2, 5-6, 8-9), musical arrangements (11-13)
 Kevin Savigar – keyboards (13), programming (13), musical arrangements (13)

Guest Musicians
 Mary J. Blige – lead vocals (11)
 Chris Botti – trumpet solo (7)
 Michael Bublé – lead vocals (3)
 Ella Fitzgerald –  sampled lead vocals (7)
 CeeLo Green – lead vocals (5)
 Dave Koz – saxophone solo (6)
 Trombone Shorty – trombone, trumpet (5, 9)

Additional Vocalists
 Bridget Cady – backing vocals (5, 9)
 Mabvuto Carpenter – choir vocals (13)
 Angela Fisher – choir vocals (13), Gospel Choir contractor
 Kimberly Johnson – backing vocals (5, 9), choir vocals, choir contractor (13)
 Krystal Johnson - choir vocals (13)
 Bobbi Page – vocal contractor (12)
 Page LA Children's Choir – backing vocals (12)
 Dieyelle Reed – backing vocals (5, 9), choir vocals (13)
 Will Wheaton – choir vocals (13)
 Gospel Choir – Keith Allen, Bridget Cady, Bryan Terrell Clark, David Daughtry, Melanie Fontana, Holly Palmer, Dieyelle Reed, Brandon Winbush and Lucy Woodward

Additional Instrumentalists
 Chris Walden – orchestra conductor (1, 3, 4, 8–13), trumpet (2, 6, 7), horn arrangements (2, 6, 7), string arrangements (3, 8, 9), trombone (7) 
 Isobel Griffiths – orchestra contractor (1, 3, 4, 8–13)
 Dean Parks – guitar (1, 2, 3, 5–9, 11, 12), guitar solo (4, 10)
 Emerson Swinford – guitar (13)
 Chuck Berghofer – bass (1, 2, 6, 7, 8, 10)
 Peter Erskine – drums (1, 2, 7, 10)
 Matt O'Connor – percussion (2, 3, 5, 6, 9), additional percussion (11)
 Jeff Driskel – saxophone (2, 6, 7)
 Jimmy Roberts – saxophone solo (9)
 Tim McFatter – tenor saxophone (5, 9)
 Dan Oestreicher – baritone saxophone (5, 9)
 Bob McChesney – trombone (2, 6)
 William Ross – string arrangements (1, 4, 10–13)
 J'Anna Jacoby – violin (13)

Production 
 Producers – Rod Stewart (Tracks 1–13); David Foster (Tracks 1–12); Kevin Savigar (Track 13).
 A&R – Jay Landers
 A&R Coordinator – Katherine Frangetis-Tempesta 
 Recorded by Don Murray, Jochem van der Saag and Jorge Vito.
 Additional Recording – Jack Miele
 Engineers – Jochem van der Saag and Jorge Vito
 Recorded at Chartmaker Studios, Henson Recording Studios,  The Village Recorder, Satinwood Studio and Studio City Sound (Los Angeles, CA); Garage Studios (Palm Beach, FL); Echo Beach Studios (Jupiter, FL); Fudge Recording Studio (New Orleans, LA).
 Orchestra recorded by Jonathan Allen and Steve Price at Abbey Road Studios (London, England) and Angel Recording Studios (Islington, England).
 Choir recorded by Tom Weir at Studio City Sound.
 Mixed by Jochem van der Saag at Blue Studios (Malibu, CA).
 Mastered by Vlado Meller at Vlado Meller Mastering (Charleston, SC).
 Art Direction and Design – Jullian Pepole Studio
 Photography – Penny Lancaster
 Management – Arnold Stiefel

Charts

Weekly charts

Year-end charts

\

Certifications

Awards and recognition
In February 2013, the album was nominated for a Canadian Juno Award in the International Album of the Year category.

References

Rod Stewart albums
2012 Christmas albums
Albums produced by David Foster
Christmas albums by British artists
Verve Records albums